The following is a list of United States Virgin Islands-based breweries.

See also
 List of microbreweries

References

External links

Virgin Islands
Breweries